The Irish College in Paris was for three centuries a major Roman Catholic educational establishment for Irish students. It was founded in the late 16th century, and closed down by the French government in the early 20th century. From 1945 to 1997, the Polish seminary in Paris was housed in the building.

Foundation
The religious persecution under Elizabeth and James I lead to the suppression of the monastic schools in Ireland in which the clergy for the most part received their education. It became necessary, therefore, to seek education abroad, and many colleges for the training of the secular clergy were founded on the continent, at Rome, in Spain and Portugal, in Belgium, and in France.

The founder of the Irish College in Paris was the Reverend John Lee, an Irish priest who came to Paris, in 1578, with six companions, and entered the Collège de Montaigu. Having completed his studies he became attached to the Church of St. Severin, and made the acquaintance of a French nobleman, John de l'Escalopier, President of the Parliament of Paris, who placed at the disposal of the Irish students in Paris a house in the rue de Sèvres, which served them as a college. Father Lee became the first rector about 1605.

Seventeenth century
Lee was followed by Thomas Dease, who was rector until 1621, when he was appointed Bishop of Meath. By letters patent dated 1623, Louis XIII conferred upon the Irish priests and scholars in Paris the right to receive and possess property. It was during the tenure of Dease's successor, Thomas Messingham, that the Irish college was recognised as a seminary by the University of Paris in 1624. Messingham organized the course of studies with a view of sending forth capable missionaries to work in their native country.

The college founded by Father Lee was not spacious enough to receive the numerous Irish students who came to Paris. Some of them continued to find a home in the Collège Montaigu, others in the Collège de Boncourt, while some, who were in affluent circumstances, resided in the Collège de Navarre. This situation attracted the attention of Vincent de Paul and others, who sought to provide them with a more suitable residence.

In 1672, the bishops of Ireland, deputed Dr. John O'Molony, Roman Catholic Bishop of Killaloe, to treat with Colbert as to the establishment of a new college. This was eventually obtained, through the influence of two Irish priests resident in Paris: Dr. Patrick Maginn, formerly first chaplain to Queen Catherine, wife of Charles II of England, and Dr. Malachy Kelly, one of the chaplains of Louis XIV. These two ecclesiastics obtained from Louis XIV authorisation to enter on possession of the Collège des Lombards, a college of the University of Paris founded for Italian students in 1333. They rebuilt the college, then in ruins, at their own expense, and became its first superiors. The acquisition of the college was confirmed by letters patent dated 1677 and 1681. Some years later the buildings were extended by Dr. John Farely, and all the Irish ecclesiastical students in Paris found a home in the Collège des Lombards.

Eighteenth century
The Irish College in Paris was open to all the counties and provinces in Ireland. In 1738, the college chapel was rebuilt under the direction of the architect Pierre Boscry. The number of students went on increasing until, in 1764, it reached 160. It was therefore found necessary to build a second college. The building was commenced in 1769 in rue du Cheval Vert, now rue des Irlandais, and the junior section of the students was transferred to the new college in 1776.  The students were divided into two categories, one, the more numerous, consisting of priests already ordained in Ireland, the other of juniors aspiring to orders. Both sections attended the university classes, either at the Collège de Plessis, or at that of Navarre, or at the Sorbonne. The course of study extended over six years, of which two were given to philosophy, three to theology, and one to special preparation for pastoral work. The more talented students remained two years longer to qualify for degrees in theology, or in canon law. 

In virtue of the papal bull of Pope Urban VIII, dated 10 July 1626, and granted in favour of all Irish colleges already established or to be established in France, Spain, Flanders, or elsewhere, the junior students were promoted to orders , even , and without dimissorial letters, on the representation of the rector of the college – a privilege withdrawn, as regards dimissorial letters, by Pope Gregory XVI. The students in priestly orders were able to support themselves to a large extent by their Mass stipends. Many burses, too, were founded for the education of students at the Lombard college. Among the founders were nine Irish bishops, thirty-two Irish priests, four medical doctors, some laymen engaged in civil or military pursuits, and a few pious ladies. The college was governed in the eighteenth century by four Irish priests called provisors, one from each province of Ireland. They were elected by the votes of the students and confirmed by the Archbishop of Paris, who, as superior major, nominated one of them to the office of the principal. In 1788, the system of government by provisors was abolished, and one rector was appointed.

In 1792 following the French Revolution, the two Irish colleges in Paris, namely the Collège des Lombards, and the then junior college, the Collège des Irlandais on the rue du Cheval Vert, were closed, as were all the other Irish colleges in France. The original library collection of the Irish College was entirely lost during the Revolution. The closing of the colleges on the Continent deprived the bishops of Ireland of the means of educating their clergy. They, therefore, petitioned the British Government for authorisation to establish an ecclesiastical college at home. The petition was granted, and Maynooth College was founded in 1795. In support of their petition, the bishops submitted a statement of the number of Irish ecclesiastics receiving education on the Continent when the French Revolution began.

During the seventeenth and eighteenth centuries, forty students of the Irish college in Paris were raised to the episcopal bench. Over the period 1660 to 1730, more than sixty Irishmen held the office of procurator of the German nation —one of the four sections of the faculty of arts in the ancient university. Dr. Michael Moore, an Irish priest, held the office of the principal of the Collège de Navarre, and was twice elected rector of the university. Many Irishmen held chairs in the university. Dr. Sleyne was professor at the Sorbonne. Dr. Power was a professor of the college at Lisieux; Dr. O'Lonergan at the college of Reims. Dr. John Plunkett, Dr. Patrick J. Plunkett, and Dr. Flood, superiors or provisors of the Irish college, were in succession royal professors of theology at the Collège de Navarre.

From its closure following the revolution, the Irish College was leased by Abbé Patrick MacDermott who ran a lay school there up until 1800; both Napoleon's youngest brother Jérôme and his step-son studied there.

Nineteenth century
After the French revolution, the Irish college in Paris was re-established by a decree of the first consul, and placed under the control of a board appointed by the French Government, creating the Fondation Irlandaise in 1805. To it was united the remnants of the property of the other Irish colleges in France which had escaped destruction. The college in Paris lost two-thirds of its endowments owing to the depreciation of French state funds, which had been reduced to one-third consolidated. The Scots College (Paris) and English college interests were also consolidated into the Irish College, their foundations were separated in 1824 again by Louis XVIII.

In 1810 Rev Richard Ferris who was appointed by the French to administer/superior of the United British (of which the Irish Colleges were part) Colleges.

In 1814 the Irish Bishops, and, following the establishment of Maynooth College, supported by the British government, twenty years earlier, sent Rev Dr. Paul Long to the college to exercise its control over the institution, and he was appointe superior. This caused friction with Rev Richard Ferris, who still held sway with many in Paris, and during Napoleon's 100days in power in 1815, Ferris briefly resumed the post as Rector/Superior.

After the Bourbon Restoration, the French Government placed at the disposal of the British government three million and a half sterling, to indemnify British subjects in France for the losses they had sustained in the Revolution. In 1816, a claim for indemnity was presented on behalf of the Irish college. That claim was rejected by the privy council in 1825 on the grounds that the college was a French establishment. In 1832 the claim was renewed by Dr. M'Sweeny, director of the college, with the same result. Another attempt to obtain compensation was made by the Rector Rev. Thomas McNamara CM in 1870. On 9 May in that year a motion was made in the House of Lords for copies of the awards in the case of the Irish college in 1825 and 1832. This step was followed up by a motion in the House of Commons for the appointment of a select committee to inquire into the claims of the college to compensation for losses sustained during the French Revolution. The motion was introduced on 30 April 1875, by Isaac Butt, MP for Limerick, and, after a prolonged discussion, it was defeated by 116 to 54 votes.

After 1805, the administration of the college was subject to a "Bureau de Surveillance" which gave much trouble until it was dissolved by Charles X of France, in 1824. After that date, the superior, appointed on presentation of the four archbishops of Ireland, became the official administrator of the foundations, subject to the minister of the interior, and at a later period to the minister of public instruction. The students no longer frequented the university. The professors were Irish priests appointed by the French Government on the presentation of the Irish episcopate. In 1858, with the sanction of the Sacred Congregation of Propaganda, and with the consent of the French Government, the bishops of Ireland placed the management of the college in the hands of the Irish Vincentian Fathers with Fr. McNamara being succeeded in 1889 by Fr Patrick Boyle CM.

In 1834 Rev McSweeney, purchased a country house at Acuril/Arcueil about an hours walk from the college, which was used by the students at weekends and public holidays. The property was sold following the second world war and redeveloped all that remains of the college is in names of palaces, villa des Irlandais and a cité des Irlandais as well as some graves of Irish priests and students in Cachan Cemetery.

In the nineteenth century the college gave to the Catholic Church a wide array of good priests and bishops, including Dr. Fitz Patrick, Abbot of Melleray; Dr. Maginn, Coadjutor Bishop of Derry; Dr. Keane, of Cloyne; Dr. Michael O'Hea and Dr. Fitz Gerald of Ross; Dr. Gillooly of Elphin, and Dr. Croke of Cashel. Dr. Kelly, the Bishop of Ross, and Dr. McSherry, vicar Apostolic at Port Elizabeth, South Africa, were also alumni of the college. Cardinal Logue held the chair of dogmatic theology from 1866 to 1874. 

On that board the Archbishop of Paris was represented by a delegate, and he was also the official medium of communication between the Irish episcopate and the French Government.

During the nineteenth and twentieth centuries, burses were available to students from Maynooth College and Clonliffe College, Dublin, to spend time in the Irish College, Paris studying at the Institut Catholique de Paris. This connection continues with recent chaplains to the college, pursuing studies in the Institut.

Twentieth Century
In December 1906, the law of separation of Church and State in France came into operation. In the following January, the French government notified the British government of its intention to reorganise the Irish Catholic foundations in France so as to bring them into harmony with the recent legislation regarding the Church. It was further stated that the purpose of the Government was to close the Irish college, to sell its immovable property, and to invest the proceeds of the sale, to be applied together with the existing burses for the benefit of Irish students.  However, due to the exertions of its superior, Patrick Boyle, and the British ambassador in Paris the college remained open until the outbreak of World War I caused its closure. During the war Boyle opened the college for use by the sisters and orphans from Verdun Orphanage. The college resumed in 1919, but closed again on the outbreak of World War II, with students evacuated, leaving Fr. Travers resident for the duration of the war. After the war, it was not reopened as an Irish College, instead, in 1947 the college was made available for use by a Polish religious community. Throughout the 1970s, 1980s and 1990s, Fr. Liam Swords, and Mgr. Dr. Devlin worked to regain the Irish control and presence in the college. In 1989 an Irish presence was re-established, and a number of renovations were made, and scholarships funded Irish students studying in Paris to stay in the college, as Cardinal O'Fiach said in 1989, (he hoped the Irish college) will one day house an Irish Cultural Centre, with library, language training, student exchanges – in short, a meeting place where Ireland will meet France and through France the wider Europe.

In 1991 the Fondation Irlandaise which officially controlled the college, was reconstituted, from six French and one Irish member, to seven members from each country, nominees to the foundation were from the Archbishop of Paris, Maynooth and The Irish Ambassador to France. The Polish community re-located to Notre-Dame de Sion in Issy-les-Moulineaux, in 1997.

400th Celebrations
In 1978, the Irish College celebrated its fourth centenary, events were held such as a reception hosted by the Irish Ambassador, mass at St. Etienne du Mont (at which Frank Patterson sang), seminar and social events in the college, many dignitaries such as Cardinal O'Fiach, Sean McBride, the Irish in France and those connected with the college in attendance, as well as academics from Irish universities and international institutions who attended the seminar.

Alumni and rectors
In the three hundred years of its existence, the college has not been without a share in the ecclesiastical literature of Ireland. Among the rectors of the college have been Thomas Messingham, prothonotary Apostolic, author of the "Florilegium Insulæ Sanctorum" (Paris, 1624); Dr. Andrew Donlevy, author of an "Anglo-Irish Catechism" (Paris, 1742); Dr. Miley, author of "A History of the Papal States" (Dublin, 1852); Dr. Thomas McNamara, author of "Programmes of Sermons" (Dublin, 1880), "Encheiridion Clericorum" (1882), and several other similar works. Abbé James MacGeoghegan, Sylvester O'Hallaran, Martin Haverty, and probably Geoffrey Keating, all eminent Irish historians, were students of the college. Dean Kinane, a student and then a professor in the college, is widely known for his "Dove of the Tabernacle" and numerous other devotional works. More recently, the Rev. John MacGuinness, C. M., vice-rector, has published a full course of dogmatic theology. Amongst the rectors of the college were Dr. John Farley and Dr. John Baptist Walsh, in the eighteenth century, and Dr. Patrick MacSweeney and the Rev. Thomas MacNamara, in the nineteenth.  Canon Charles Ouin La Croix, from Rouen administered the college from 1859 until 1873. Fr Charles O'Neill was College president in the 18th century.

Alumni
 Eugène de Beauharnais – Duke of Leuchtenberg and stepson of Napoleon Bonaparte, attended the lay college established following the revolution
 Jérôme Bonaparte – youngest brother of Napoleon attended the lay college 
 Henry Conwell – Bishop of Philadelphia
 William Coppinger – Bishop of Cloyne and Ross
 Thomas Croke DD – Archbishop of Cashel
 Daniel Delany DD – Bishop of Kildare and Leighlin 
 James Dillon DD – Bishop of Kilmore
 Peter Flood DD – second President of St. Patrick's College, Maynooth.
 James Gallagher MA – Bishop of Raphoe(1725–37),Bishop of Kildare and Leighlin(1737–51)
 Laurence Gillooly CM – Bishop of Elphin
 Neal McCabe CM – Bishop of Ardagh and Clonmacnoise, served as Rector 1866–68, buried in the vincentian community plot in Montparnasse, Paris.
 John McCarthy DD, Bishop Sandhurst, Australia, 1917-1950
 Patrick Joseph Plunkett – Bishop of Meath, served as superior and professor in paris
 Charles Tuohy DD – Bishop of Limerick 1813-28

Rectors & Superiors
 Rev. John Lee (1605- )
 Rev. Thomas Dease ( -1621), appointed Bishop of Meath
 Rev. Thomas Messingham STD (1621-1632), rector when the college was officially linked to the University of Paris in 1626.
 Rev. James Merrick, Superior 
 Rev. Dr. John Farley MA DTh (1728-1736), principal
 Rev. Dr. Patrick Corr (1736-1738), principal
 Rev. Dr. Patrick Joseph Plunkett (1770-1778) joint Superior of the Irish College(College of the Lombards), and royal professor of theology, Collège de Navarre.
 Rev. Dr. Charles Kearney (1782-1787), superior/rector, remained in paris
 Rev. Dr. John Baptist Walsh MA, LTh, DTh (1787-1814), superior, responsible for the Fondation Irlandais/Irish College inheriting and acquiring the legacy and equity of the Irish and British Colleges in France.
 Rev. Richard Ferris(1810-1814, 1815), "colourful" and controversial superior and administrator of the British(which included the Irish) Colleges.
 Rev. Dr. Paul Long MA DTh (1814-1819), administrator, sent by Maynooth to assert Irish control of the college and its interests.
 Rev. Dr. Charles Kearney (1820-1824), reappointed rector, he died in 1824 and interred in the college vaults.
 Rev. Dr. Paul McSweeney (1828-1849)
 Rev. John Miley (1849-1858) 
 Rev. James Lynch CM (1858-1866), first Vincentian rector
 Rev. Neal McCabe CM (1866-1868)
 Rev. Thomas McNamara CM (1868-1889)
 Rev. Patrick Boyle CM (1889-1926), re-established the college following its closure during World War I, her remained and taught in the college until his death in 1933.
 Rev. John Magennis (McGuinness) CM (1926-1932)
 Rev. Joseph P. Sheedy CM (1932-1938)
 Rev. Patrick Travers CM DD (1938–39) he stayed at the college during the Second World War. Reappointed and served from (1949-1972)
 Rev. Henry Casey (1945-1949)
 Rev. Patrick Travers CM DD, Reappointed (1949-1972), non-resident, with Rev. William McGlynn resident priest, liaising with French Government.
 Rev. Thomas Fagan CM (1972-1984), non-resident in the college, in 1984 the vincentians relinquished their position as rectors of the college.
 Rev. Dr. Brendan Devlin MA DD (1984-2001), rector and manager

Following the reappointment of Dr. Travers, the rector was not resident in the college, and only visited periodically to look after the Irish interest in the college which was being used seminary training polish priests, Seminaire Polonais de Paris(1947–97). An Irish Catholic presence was re-established in the 1970s when the historian and archivist (sometimes referred to as rector), Fr. Liam Swords became Chaplain, to Irish Community in Paris, and was responsible for the development of the college into a cultural institution.

Chaplains (or Aumônier, Collège des Irlandais)
 Rev. Liam Swords (1978-1994), first priest in residence since 1945
 Rev. Desmond Knowles (1994-1998)
 Rev. Pearce Walsh (1998-2002)
 Rev. Desmond Knowles (2002-2003)
 Rev. Declan Hurley (2003-2008)
 Rev. David Bracken (2008-2011)
 Rev. Sean Maher (2011-2014)
 Rev. Dwayne Gavin (2014-2017)
 Rev. Hugh Connolly (2017–2022), Mons. Connolly served as board member and secretary of the Fondation Irlandais, when in Maynooth.

 Rev. Jim Doyle (2022-)

Today
The Polish community having re-located in 1997, the college, including the chapel and library underwent a complete restoration funded by the Irish government, and in 2002 it opened as the Centre Culturel Irlandais. The center appoints an artist in residence, and a number of scholars and students from Ireland stay at the college, which has 45 rooms to rent. The CCI hosts various concerts, performances, seminars, and exhibitions, Irish Language classes are conducted in association with Maynooth University. The Irish Chaplaincy in Paris is based in the centre, and uses the college's Chapelle Saint-Patrick for services, such as weekly mass (followed by coffee and a chat), weddings, baptisms and the annual carol service in the chapel by the choir for the Irish community in paris. The harmonium was restored funded by the Ireland Funds France. The Irish Chaplain assists in the local Saint Etienne du Mont parish and the chaplaincy also works closely with the other church in Paris which holds English language services, St. Josephs Church run by the Passionists (currently served by two Irish born priests). The only part of the older College des Lombards remaining, is the chapel, which since 1927 used by the Saint-Éphrem-le-Syriac Church, the Irish Chaplain holds an annual service there for those Irish who are buried older college site. Also at the recently restored Irish College plot in Cachan Cemetery, Arcueil-Cachan, Paris.

See also
 Irish College in Bordeaux (1603-1794) – merged into Fondation Irlandais
 Irish College, Douai (1603-1793)
 Irish College in Toulouse (1618-1793) – merged into Fondation Irlandais
 Irish College at Lisbon
 Irish College in Rome
 Irish College at Salamanca (1592-1952)
 Irish Dominican St Anthony's College, Leuven (1607-1983), Accommodation, and Cultural Centre

Sources
Irish in Europe archives

References

External links
 Centre Culturel Irlandais website
 Irish Chaplaincy Paris – resident in the old college, and uses the Chapelle Saint-Patrick.

Colleges of the University of Paris
Former Catholic seminaries
1605 establishments in France
Irish diaspora in Europe
Irish Colleges on the Continent